Saint-Basile is a municipality situated in Portneuf Regional County Municipality in the Canadian province of Quebec.

Demographics 

Population trend:
 Population in 2011: 2463 (2006 to 2011 population change: -3.8%)
 Population in 2006: 2560
 Population in 2001: 2575
 Population in 1996:
 Saint-Basile (parish): 840
 Saint-Basile-Sud (village): 1684
 Population in 1991:
 Saint-Basile (parish): 823
 Saint-Basile-Sud (village): 1733

Mother tongue:
 English as first language: 2.4%
 French as first language: 95.4%
 English and French as first language: 0.4%
 Other as first language: 1.8%

References

External links 

 Territoire de St-Basile - MRC de Portneuf

Cities and towns in Quebec
Incorporated places in Capitale-Nationale
Portneuf Regional County Municipality